Heliophorus indicus, the Indian purple sapphire, is a small butterfly found in India that belongs to the lycaenids or blues family. The species was first described by Hans Fruhstorfer in 1908.

See also
List of butterflies of India
List of butterflies of India (Lycaenidae)

References

 
  
 
 
 
 

Heliophorus
Butterflies of Asia
Butterflies described in 1908